The 1998 Mercedes-Benz Cup was a men's tennis tournament played on hardcourt in Los Angeles, United States that was part of the International Series of the 1998 ATP Tour. It was the seventy-first edition of the tournament and was held from July 27 through August 2, 1998.

Seeds
Champion seeds are indicated in bold text while text in italics indicates the round in which those seeds were eliminated.

Draw

Finals

References

Doubles
Los Angeles Open (tennis)